Ralph Harold Brickner (May 2, 1925 – May 9, 1994) was a relief pitcher in Major League Baseball who played for the Boston Red Sox in the 1952 season. He was born in Cincinnati, and attended Indiana University.

Brickner was a member of the IU Hoosiers baseball team in 1946–47. Signed originally by the Philadelphia Phillies' organization, he was selected by the Red Sox from the independent Portsmouth Cubs of the Piedmont League in the 1950 minor league draft, and reached the Major Leagues on May 2, 1952. He had a successful rookie season with the Red Sox, appearing in 14 games, 13 in relief, and posting a 3–1 win–loss record with one save and an earned run average of only 2.18 with nine strikeouts and 32 hits allowed and 11 bases on balls in 33 innings pitched. But a shoulder injury diagnosed as bursitis curtailed his pitching career.  He played his final MLB game on September 17, 1952, and retired after spending 1953 in minor league baseball.

Ralph Brickner died in Bridgetown, Ohio, at the age of 69.

External links

Baseball Almanac
Retrosheet

1925 births
1994 deaths
Baseball players from Cincinnati
Birmingham Barons players
Boston Red Sox players
Indiana Hoosiers baseball players
Louisville Colonels (minor league) players
Major League Baseball pitchers
Portsmouth Cubs players
Terre Haute Phillies players
Toronto Maple Leafs (International League) players
Utica Blue Sox players
Elder High School alumni